The Junpai D80 or Jumpal D80 is a compact crossover produced by Jumpal or Junpai (骏派), a sub-brand of FAW Group.

Overview 

The Junpai D80 crossover was first launched in 2018. Formerly known as the FAW Junpai T086, the crossover was originally launched in January 2018.
Prices of the Junpai D80 at launch ranges from 79,900 yuan to 125,900 yuan.

References

External links 

 Official Junpai D60 Website
 Official postfacelift Junpai D60 Website

D80
Front-wheel-drive vehicles
Crossover sport utility vehicles
2010s cars
Cars introduced in 2018
Cars of China